is a Japanese model and tarento from Inazawa, Aichi Prefecture. She is represented by the talent agency Avex Management and is currently active in Tokyo. Nukumi was a former Popteen magazine model and is currently an exclusive model for the fashion magazine CanCam.

She is known by the name of Meruru.

Career 
In 2015, Nukumi became an exclusive model for Popteen after participating in Tokyo Girls Audition 2015 and winning the Popteen and Ray awards. She graduated from Popteen in January, 2021.

In March, 2021, it was announced that Nukumi would become an exclusive model for the fashion magazine CanCam, first appearing on the March 23rd issue of the magazine.

Filmography

Film

Television

Awards

References

External links
 

2002 births
Living people
Japanese female models
Japanese television personalities
Models from Aichi Prefecture
People from Inazawa